The 2004 Campeonato Nacional Apertura Copa Banco del Estado was the 75th Chilean League top flight, in which Universidad de Chile won its twelfth league title after beating Cobreloa in the final, on penalties, with goalkeeper Johnny Herrera scoring the winning penalty kick.

Qualifying stage

Results

Group standings

Group A

Group B

Group C

Group D

Aggregate table

Repechaje

Playoffs

First round
Deportes Temuco and Universidad de Chile qualified as best losers.

Knockout stage

Finals

Top goalscorers

Pre-Copa Sudamericana 2004 Tournament

Preliminary round
Played on June 28 & July 4, 2004

First round
Played on July 7 & 10, 2004

*Qualified due to its better Apertura 2004 position

Second round
Played on July 21 & 25, 2004

*Qualified due to its better Apertura 2004 position

Final round

Santiago Wanderers & Universidad de Concepción qualified to 2004 Copa Sudamericana

References

External links
RSSSF Chile 2004

Primera División de Chile seasons
Chile
2004 in Chilean football